Brzezinka is a village in the administrative district of Gmina Bobrowice, within Krosno Odrzańskie County, Lubusz Voivodeship, in western Poland.

The village has a population of 46.

History
The area became part of the emerging Polish state in the 10th century. Centuries later it fell to Prussia and Germany. It became again part of Poland following Germany's defeat in World War II in 1945.

References

Villages in Krosno Odrzańskie County